Moritz Oswald (born 5 January 2002) is an Austrian professional footballer who plays as a midfielder for Rapid Wien.

Career
Oswald is a youth product of SC Perchtoldsdorf, and Rapid Wien. He began his professional career with their reserves in 2020, before debuting for their senior team in a 1–1 Austrian Football Bundesliga tie with Hartberg on 24 October 2021. On 8 February 2022, he signed a professional contract with the club until June 2025.

International career
Oswald was called up to the Austria U21s for 2023 UEFA European Under-21 Championship qualification matches in June 2022.

Career statistics

References

External links
 
 OEFB Profile

2002 births
Living people
Austrian footballers
SK Rapid Wien players
Austrian Football Bundesliga players
2. Liga (Austria) players
Austrian Regionalliga players
Association football midfielders